The 2017 season was the 112th season of Club Alianza Lima.

Squad

Friendlies

Competitions

Overall

Peruvian Primera División 
The 2017 Torneo Descentralizado de Fútbol Profesional was the 101st season of the highest division of Peruvian football.

Torneo de Verano

Group B

Results by round 

A = Away; H = Home; W = Win; D = Draw; L = Loss

Torneo Apertura

Results by round 

A = Away; H = Home; W = Win; D = Draw; L = Loss

Torneo Clausura

Results by round 

A = Away; H = Home; W = Win; D = Draw; L = Loss

Playoffs 
As Alianza Lima and Real Garcilaso finished both as champions and runners-up of the Apertura and Clausura tournaments, no playoff games were played. Alianza Lima were the overall champions and Real Garcilaso were the overall runners-up.

Copa Sudamericana

First stage 
Independiente won 1–0 on aggregate and advanced to the second stage.

References 

Alianza Lima seasons